Zen-Ruffinen Castle or Loretan also known as de Werra is a castle in the municipality of Leuk of the Canton of Valais in Switzerland. It is a Swiss heritage site of national significance.

The complex consists of several buildings constructed over centuries. Zen-Ruffinen was built for the Zen-Ruffinen family in the 17th century. The center of the building and the stair tower were built in 1611–12. The Zen-Ruffinen family was a powerful patrician family which included two Bishops of Sion. The complex was extended for Baron Ferdinand de Werra in the 19th century. The south-west corner of the de Werra extension includes an older wall from 1630.

See also
 List of castles in Switzerland
 Château

References

Castles in the canton of Valais
Cultural property of national significance in Valais